is a town located in Fukushima Prefecture, Japan. , the town had an official registered population of 6,784 in 2956 households, and a population density of 65 persons per km2, although the current actual resident population is significantly smaller. From 2011 until 2015, the town was evacuated due to fallout from the Fukushima Daiichi nuclear disaster. While the town wasn't severely contaminated by the fallout, restrictions on residency were held until September 2015 when cleanup efforts concluded, allowing people to return. Naraha is the first of several towns and cities near Fukushima Daiichi Nuclear Power Plant to have been reopened to residents. Repair and reconstruction efforts have been underway in Naraha since 2016, and numerous landmarks in the town have been rebuilt and reopened.

Geography
Naraha is located in southern of Fukushima Prefecture, bordering on the Pacific Ocean to the east.

Surrounding municipalities
Fukushima Prefecture
Iwaki
Hirono
Tomioka
Kawauchi

Demographics
Per Japanese census data, the population of Naraha remained relatively steady for the 40 years prior to the nuclear disaster.

Climate
Naraha has a humid climate (Köppen climate classification Cfa).

History
The area of present-day Naraha was part of Mutsu Province, and was included in the tenryō holdings of the Tokugawa shogunate during Edo period Japan. After the Meiji restoration, on April 1, 1889, the villages of Kido and Tatsuta was created within Naraha District, Fukushima with the establishment of the modern municipalities system. Naraha District became Futaba District in 1896. The villages of Kido and Tatsuta merged in 1956 to form the town of Naraha.

2011 earthquake and tsunami

Naraha suffered great devastation as a result of the March 11 earthquake and subsequent tsunami. As a result of the Fukushima Daiichi nuclear disaster, as well as problems experienced with its cooling facility of the Fukushima Daini Nuclear Power Plant (see timeline), the town was totally evacuated by order of the town government. The entire area of the town fell within the 20 kilometer exclusion zone around the Fukushima Daiichi Power Plant. On August 1, 2012, the government eased the restriction order by allowing residents to visit their homes during daylight hours, but not permitting overnight stays. In March 2014, Naraha completed decontamination work in its residential areas, although radiation levels remained high in some areas of the town, and many buildings were still in ruins. By April 2015, residents could stay overnight if they applied for permission, and the evacuation order was lifted completely effective September 4, 2015. Reconstruction efforts in the town commenced in 2016.

Naraha is listed among several neighbouring towns as a ‘special zone for reconstruction and revitalisation’; as repair works are underway, several key milestones were met in the years following the evacuation order being lifted. In April 2018, the town's Elementary and Junior High schools were reopened, while in July, J-Village was fully repaired and opened to the public.

Economy
The economy of Naraha was formerly heavily dependent on agriculture. The Fukushima Daini Nuclear Power Plant was also a major employer.

Education
Naraha had  two public elementary schools and one public middle school in March 2011.

Transportation

Railway
JR East –  Jōban Line 
 -  –

Highway
  – Naraha Parking Area and Smart Interchange

Local attractions
Among other attractions, Naraha houses J-Village, a state-of-the-art sports training and convention facility that also houses a hotel, restaurant and public bath. The Argentina National Football Team stayed at J-Village for the 2002 World Cup.  Naraha also houses one of Japan's fifty-seven cycling terminals and an onsen.

International relations
 - Wuchang (China) since 1992
 - Euclid, Ohio (United States) since 1993.

References

External links 

Official Website 

Towns in Fukushima Prefecture
Populated coastal places in Japan
Naraha, Fukushima